Kleofina Pnishi, born July 23, 1994, in Gjakova (Kosovo), is a French actress and model, of Kosovar origin. She was elected Miss Provence 2017.

Biography

Early life and education 
She has a little brother and a little sister. Her father is the head of a masonry company and her mother is a housewife. She arrived in Peyrolles in 1999, fleeing Kosovo, which was then in the middle of a war, when she was 5 years old.

She graduated from the School of Journalism and Communication of Aix-Marseille.

Career

Miss France 
Kleofina Pnishi was elected Miss Provence 2017 for Miss France 2018 on July 29, 2017, in Cogolin and succeeds Noémie Mazella, Miss Provence 2016.

Pekin Express 
In 2019, she participates in season 12 of Peking Express alongside Julia Sidi-Atman (Miss French Riviera 2017).

Filmography 

 2019 : The Brave (aka Lazarat)

Television 

 2015 : Plus belle la vie on TF1
 2015 : Le mystère du lac on TF1
 2015 : Meurtres au Mont Ventoux on France 3
 2016 : Petits secrets entre voisins on TF1
 2019 : Pékin Express : La Route des 50 volcans on M6

References

External links 
 Official website
 
 

1994 births
French female models
Living people
People from Provence